Platystele is a genus of orchids, comprising about 95 species. Most of these have small flowers, some of the smallest in the family. The genus is widespread across Mexico, Central America, the West Indies, and South America as far south as Bolivia, but infrequent in Brazil. Luer, C. A. 1990. Icones Pleurothallidinarum–VII. Systematics of Platystele (Orchidaceae). Monographs in systematic botany from the Missouri Botanical Garden 38: 1–135.

Images

References

External links 

Pleurothallidinae genera
Pleurothallidinae
Orchids of South America
Orchids of Mexico